Radzików may refer to the following places in Poland:
Radzików, Lower Silesian Voivodeship (south-west Poland)
Radzików, Masovian Voivodeship (east-central Poland)
Radzików, Lubusz Voivodeship (west Poland)